Catholic Ladies College, Eltham (also known simply as CLC Eltham) is an independent Roman Catholic single-sex secondary day school for girls, located in the Melbourne suburb of Eltham, Victoria, Australia. The school provides a Catholic and general education to girls from Year 7 to Year 12.

History 

The school was founded by the Sisters of Charity of Australia in 1902. The school was originally in East Melbourne. The land on which the school was built was bought by Mother Mary Berchmans Daly in 1898.

Under the mother-rectress Mary Catherine Bruton or Mother Canice, in post from 1914, the school performed well in examinations, and the study of science subjects began.

When Damien Broderick's mother attended the school in the 1930s, it was "moderately upmarket".

The school moved to Eltham in 1971.

Houses 
The four houses and their associated colours are:
Loyola, the yellow house, named after St Ignatius of Loyola.
Marita, the blue house, named in honor of Jesus' mother.
Aikenhead, the green house, named in honor of Mary Aikenhead.
Vincentia, the red house, named after St Vincent De Paul.

House activities and competitions include swimming, sports, athletics, and Founders Day activities.

Academic rankings

Notable former students 
 Louise Lightfoot, architect, choreographer and dancer
Kate Moloney, netballer
Vicki Ward, politician
Steph Chiocci-AFLW Footballer
Virginia Haussegger
Maddy Brancatisano-AFLW player
Ashleigh Riddell-AFLW player

See also 

 List of schools in Victoria, Australia
 Catholic education in Australia

References

Further reading
 Catholic Ladies' College: The first hundred years 1902-2002,  Guy, Roslyn (2002)

External links 
 Catholic Ladies College Website
 Caritas, the school magazine, for 1937
 Caritas, the school magazine, for 1938

Art Deco architecture in Melbourne
Educational institutions established in 1902
Girls' schools in Victoria (Australia)
Catholic secondary schools in Melbourne
1902 establishments in Australia
Buildings and structures in the Shire of Nillumbik